Oweniidae is a family of marine polychaete worms in the suborder Sabellida. The worms live in tubes made of sand and are selective filter feeders, detritivores and grazers.

Characteristics
Members of this family live in tubes made of sand and shell fragments. The head of the worm does not bear a proboscis, but has the mouth at the tip rimmed by some very short tentacles. The body segments lack parapodia and are smooth elongated cylinders. There are a large number of hooked chaetae or bristles on a small pad on the ventral side of each segment. These chaetae have two parallel teeth resembling claws which is a feature that distinguishes members of this family from other polychaetes. The posterior tip bears different appendages in different genera. Family members are unique in having a bell-shaped larval stage known as a mitraria larva. At one time the family was classified as the Ammocharidae.

Genera

 Galathowenia Kirkegaard, 1959
 Myriochele Malmgren, 1867
 Myriowenia Hartman, 1960
 Owenia Delle Chiaje, 1844

References 

Sabellida
Annelid families